Anastácio Artur Ruben Sicato is an Angolan politician for the UNITA and a member of the National Assembly of Angola.

References

Members of the National Assembly (Angola)
UNITA politicians
Living people
Year of birth missing (living people)
Place of birth missing (living people)
21st-century Angolan politicians